The Nevada Assembly is the lower house of the Nevada Legislature, the state legislature of the U.S. state of Nevada, the upper house being the Nevada Senate. The body consists of 42 members, elected to two-year terms from single-member districts. Each district contained approximately 64,299 people as of the 2010 United States Census. Term limits, limiting assembly members to six 2-year terms (12 years), took effect in 2010. Twelve members of the Nevada Assembly were termed out with the 2010 election serving their last legislative session in 2011.

The Nevada Assembly met at the Nevada State Capitol in Carson City until 1971, when a separate Legislative Building was constructed south of the Capitol.  The Legislative Building was expanded in 1997 to its current appearance to accommodate the growing Nevada Legislature. Since the 2012 session, Assembly districts have been formed by dividing the 21 Senate districts in half, so that each Assembly district is nested within a Senate district.

Meetings
The Assembly, like the Senate, is composed of citizen legislators, receiving a relatively small ($130) per diem fee for the first 60 days of a given session.  This tends to self-selection, with legislative service difficult for those without flexible jobs and/or large outside incomes, such as doctors and lawyers. The Assembly, again like the Senate, meets however long is necessary for the completion of all its business, up to a maximum of 120 days, beginning the first Monday in February of every odd-numbered year.  While this is designed to limit the amount of time a legislator is away from their first job, in recent years 120 days has often not been enough time to complete legislative business, and after four straight regular sessions, special sessions had been called to finish up legislative business.  This trend ended in 2011, which was not followed by a special session.

Leadership of the Assembly
The Speaker of the Assembly presides over the Assembly in the chief leadership position, controlling the flow of legislation and committee assignments.  The Speaker is elected by the majority party caucus, followed by confirmation of the full Assembly on  passage of a floor vote.  Other Assembly leaders, such as the majority and minority leaders, are elected by their respective party caucuses according to each party's strength in the chamber.

Assembly Chamber
The Nevada Assembly convenes in the south chamber of the Legislative Building.  The carpet in the Assembly chamber is mainly red, in comparison to the Senate chamber, which is blue.  The chamber galleries reflect the same carpet schemes.  Many legislative documents and binders are colored red and blue to distinguish them between the Assembly and the Senate.  Although the chamber is separated by a center aisle, the Assemblymen are not seated by party.  Rather they are seated at the discretion of the Speaker.  The Speaker's desk is always the first desk in the front row to the right, if you are looking out at the chamber from the Speaker's rostrum.  Above the Speaker is a large gavel, which is engraved with the name of Speaker Joe Dini; the longest serving Speaker of the Nevada Assembly.  Above the gavel is a portrait of Abraham Lincoln, who was President when Nevada became a State in 1864.  To the left of the main door to the chamber is a podium with a Bible, which is changed to different passages by the Assembly Sargeant-at-Arms.

Since 2003, one floor session has always been held in the Old Assembly Chambers in the State Capitol.  The session usually begins with a presentation from the State Archivist regarding the history of the chamber, and then legislative business proceeds as usual.  Because there are no screens or voting equipment in the old chamber, all business is hand-written on a chalk board, as it would have been done when the Assembly still met in the Capitol.

All joint-meetings and joint-sessions are held in the Assembly chamber, including the State of the State Address, the State of the Judiciary Address, and addresses from Nevada's federal delegation.  Unlike in Congress, where the Speaker of the House presides over all joint-meetings and sessions (except when Congress counts the Electoral Votes after a Presidential election), the President of the Senate presides over joint-meetings and sessions instead of the Speaker of the Assembly.

Composition

Leadership of the Assembly
The Speaker of the Assembly presides over the Assembly in the chief leadership position, controlling the flow of legislation and committee assignments.  The Speaker is elected by the majority party caucus, followed by confirmation of the full Assembly on passage of a floor vote. Other Assembly leaders, such as the majority and minority leaders, are elected by their respective party caucuses according to each party's strength in the chamber.

Members

† Member was originally appointed.

Past composition of the Assembly

See also
Nevada Senate
Nevada Legislature
Nevada State Capitol

Notes

References

External links
Nevada Assembly
Members of the Nevada Assembly
Speakers of the Nevada Assembly (1864–2007)

Assembly
State lower houses in the United States